This article displays the rosters for the participating teams at the 2013 FIBA Africa Club Championship for Women.

Club Omnisport De Meknès

Dolphins

Eagle Wings

First Deepwater

Interclube

IR Tanger

Primeiro de Agosto

USIU Flames

See also
 2013 FIBA Africa Championship squads

References

External links
 2012 FIBA Africa Champions Cup Participating Teams

FIBA Africa Women's Clubs Champions Cup squads
Basketball teams in Africa
FIBA
FIBA